Phrygiomurex is a genus of sea snails, marine gastropod mollusks in the family Muricidae, the murex snails or rock snails. The genus contains the single species Phrygiomurex sculptilis.

References

 
Monotypic gastropod genera